Les Genêts d'Anglet Football is a French football team founded in 1910. It is based in Anglet, Pyrénées-Atlantiques, France and plays in the Championnat National 3. They play at the Stade Choisy in Anglet.

Current squad

References

Association football clubs established in 1910
1910 establishments in France
Sport in Pyrénées-Atlantiques
Organizations based in Northern Basque Country
Football clubs in Nouvelle-Aquitaine